The MB50 is a Honda motorcycle known as the MB5 in the US, produced from 1979 into the late 1980s. The MB was the road oriented version of the Honda MT50. Sales ended in 1981 in the UK and 1982 in the US (the only year imported), but sales continued in other European countries until 1988. 

The MB5 was a very light motorcycle, filling a similar transportation role to a motorscooter, though styled like a sport bike, with a  two-stroke single-cylinder engine, and a 5-speed manual transmission. The MB5 also had a speedometer, a tachometer (with a redline of 10,500 rpm), front disc brake, and Honda's comstar wheels.

The MB-5 was short-lived in the US; Honda only imported it in 1982, it was more popular in Europe (see MB/T/X series).

Mb50
Motorcycles introduced in 1979
Two-stroke motorcycles